Cachryx is a genus of lizards in the family Iguanidae.

Taxonomy
Currently, there are two described species in this genus.
 Campeche spiny-tailed iguana, Cachryx alfredschmidti (Kohler, 1995)
 Yucatán spinytail iguana, Cachryx defensor (Cope, 1866)

References

 
Lizard genera
Taxa named by Edward Drinker Cope